Przymorze Wielkie is one of the quarters of the city of Gdańsk in Poland.

The district is mainly composed of length buildings. There is also a modern shopping mall—Kołobrzeska Centre. It also has beautiful sandy beaches and strip of natural forest between housing part and the beach. It has a bicycle route.

An important attraction is Ronald Reagan Park.

See also
 Przymorze, Przymorze Małe

External links
 Map of Przymorze Wielkie

References

Gdańsk